The Kachura Lakes are three lakes in the Skardu District of Gilgit-Baltistan, northern Pakistan. The latter is also known as Shangrila Lake and is within a tourist resort named Shangrila Resort outside the town of Skardu another lake called Zambakha Lake is situated in the small village Zambakha adjacent to Shangri-la. The lakes are in the Karakoram mountain range of the western Himalayas, the greater Kashmir region, and in the Indus River basin.

Upper Kachura Lake

In winter the surface is frozen solid. The upper Indus River flows nearby at a lower elevation. 

The beauty of the Upper Kachura Lake is almost untampered and mostly unexplored by travelers, due to lack of infrastructure owing to its rough terrain The area has a rich flora of the Western Himalayan subalpine conifer forests ecoregion, and also known for its wild apricot - Prunus armeniaca orchards. Recreation activities at Upper Kachura Lake include hiking, trout fishing, and Himalaya mountaineering.

Lower Kachura Lake (kandoor)

See also
Northern Areas
List of lakes in Pakistan

Gallery

References

External links
Photos from Upper Kachura Lake and Skardu by Waqas Usman
Imran Ahmed's Photo gallery

Lakes of Gilgit-Baltistan